Ludemar Pereira Barros, known as Ludemar (born 1 June 1979) is a former Brazilian football player.

Club career
He made his Primeira Liga debut for Belenenses on 25 August 2002 in a game against Porto.

References

1979 births
Sportspeople from Goiás
Living people
Brazilian footballers
Rio Branco Esporte Clube players
Rio Branco Football Club players
Clube Náutico Capibaribe players
C.F. Os Belenenses players
Brazilian expatriate footballers
Expatriate footballers in Portugal
Primeira Liga players
U.D. Leiria players
Guarani FC players
Ituano FC players
G.D. Estoril Praia players
Liga Portugal 2 players
Coritiba Foot Ball Club players
Al Dhafra FC players
Expatriate footballers in the United Arab Emirates
Clube Atlético Juventus players
Sociedade Esportiva do Gama players
Santa Helena Esporte Clube players
Vila Nova Futebol Clube players
Anápolis Futebol Clube players
Santa Cruz Futebol Clube players
UAE First Division League players
Association football forwards